Hutton Cranswick railway station serves the village of Hutton Cranswick in the East Riding of Yorkshire, England.

The station has retained its main buildings, though they are now in residential use.  It is unmanned, but a recent addition is an electronic ticket machine on the Southbound platform, where passengers can purchase or collect tickets. There are shelters and timetable posters on each platform and step-free access is available to both (the southbound one via the automatic level crossing at the Hull end).

Services

Sundays also sees an hourly service in each direction to Scarborough and to Sheffield via Hull.

References

External links

Railway stations in the East Riding of Yorkshire
DfT Category F2 stations
Railway stations in Great Britain opened in 1846
Northern franchise railway stations
Stations on the Hull to Scarborough line
1846 establishments in England
Former York and North Midland Railway stations
George Townsend Andrews railway stations